The Heisman High School Scholarship in the past known as Wendy's High School Heisman Memorial Trophy Award (also known as the Wendy's High School Heisman), named after former college football player and coach John Heisman, is a prestigious award in American high-school athletics. The current spokesman is Archie Griffin, the only two-time Heisman Trophy recipient and current President/CEO of the Ohio State University Alumni Association.

Overview and history
In 1994, the Heisman High School Scholarship was created to honor high school student-athletes. Each fall, the program recognizes the nation's most esteemed high-school-senior men and women for excellence in academics, athletics, and community involvement.

Each school can nominate one male and one female student-athlete per year. To date, there have been more than 136,000 nominees. The field of nominees is narrowed to 1,020 State Finalists, 10 male and 10 female per state (plus the District of Columbia), who are announced in late October. In early November, the field is narrowed to 102 State Winners, one male and one female from each state.

In mid-November, a judging panel selects 12 National Finalists, one male and one female from each of six geographical regions. Two National Winners, one male and one female, are selected from the National Finalists and are honored during ESPN's national telecast of the college Heisman Memorial Trophy on December 9. Of all the nominees, 145 have progressed to the National Finalist level, with 24 (two per year, one male and one female) earning the designation of Wendy's High School Heisman National Award Winners. The annual awards show is telecast on ESPN2.

Eligibility
The nominee must have a grade of B (3.0) or better. They have to also leader in there school and in the community. Each nominee must participate in a sport which is at the program of the Olympic or Paralympic Games or a sport recognized by the National Federation of State High School Associations: Archery, Badminton, Baseball, Basketball, Biathlon, BMX Racing (or Freestyle), Bobsleigh, Boccia, Bowling, Boxing, Breaking, Canoeing/Rowing, Cross Country, Curling, Cycling, Dance, Diving, Equestrian (Dressage/Eventing/Jumping), Fencing, Field Hockey, Football, Futsal, Goalball, Golf, Gymnastics, Handball, Ice Hockey, Ice Skating (Figure or Speed), Judo, Karate, Lacrosse, Luge, Modern Pentathlon, Mountain Bike, Nordic Combined, Powerlifting, Rowing, Rugby, Sailing, Shooting, Skateboarding, Skeleton, Skiing (Alpine, Biathlon, Cross Country, Free-Style, Jumping), Snowboard, Soccer, Softball, Spirit/Cheerleading, Sport Climbing, Surfing, Swimming (or Synchronized), Table Tennis, Taekwondo, Tennis, Track & Field, Trampoline, Triathlon, Volleyball (or Beach), Water Polo, Weightlifting and Wrestling.

Past winners

The program was created in 1994, with more than 6,200 nominations submitted in the first year from high schools nationwide. Since then, more than 150,000 students have been nominated.

See also
Mississippi Sports Hall of Fame & Museum ("Wendy's High School Gallery", which recognizes the Wendy's High School Heisman winners from Mississippi)
Gatorade Player of the Year awards (in various sports)
Dial Award (defunct)
National High School Hall of Fame

Footnotes

External links
Official website

High school sports in the United States
American sports trophies and awards
Student athlete awards in the United States
Awards established in 1994
1994 establishments in the United States